NH 88 may refer to:

 National Highway 88 (India)
 New Hampshire Route 88, United States